The  Khost suicide bombing occurred on 12 July 2015 in Khost Province when a suicide bombing killed at least 33 people, including 12 children  and another 10 people were wounded.

See also
 War in Afghanistan (2015–2021)

References

2015 murders in Afghanistan
Suicide bombings in 2015
Suicide bombings in Afghanistan
Mass murder in 2015
Terrorist incidents in Afghanistan in 2015
July 2015 events in Afghanistan
History of Khost Province